James Hall (born James E. Brown; October 22, 1900 – June 7, 1940) was an American film actor.

Career
Born in Dallas, Texas, Hall debuted as an actor at age 15 in the Ziegfeld Follies.

Hall began his film career during the silent film era. He made his sound film debut in the 1929 film The Canary Murder Case, opposite William Powell and Louise Brooks.

In 1930, he co-starred in Howard Hughes' epic film, Hell's Angels. His last film role was in the 1932 drama Manhattan Tower. In the following years, he headlined in vaudeville at the Loew's State Theatres in 1932 and 1933 and in such independent stage productions as Ches Davis's 1934 edition of the Chicago Follies and in another show, the Showboat Follies at the Deadwood Theatre in South Dakota (1934).

At the time of his death, he had fallen into obscurity and had been earning his livelihood by performing in small nightclubs and cabarets in New Jersey and New York.

Death
Hall died of cirrhosis on June 7, 1940, in Jersey City, New Jersey, at age 39. He is buried in Holy Cross Cemetery, North Arlington, New Jersey.

Filmography

References

External links

Photographs and literature

1900 births
1940 deaths
20th-century American male actors
Male actors from Dallas
American male film actors
American male silent film actors
Burials at Holy Cross Cemetery (North Arlington, New Jersey)
Deaths from cirrhosis
Drug-related deaths in New Jersey